Qareh Aghach (also Romanized as Qareh Āghāch; also known as Qareh Āghāj) is a village in Tamran Rural District, in the Central District of Kalaleh County, Golestan Province, Iran. At the 2006 census, its population was 1,426, in 282 families.

References 

Populated places in Kalaleh County